Henri Labussière (1919–2008) was a French actor and comedian. He mostly appeared on stage in various comedy plays between 1949 and 2000. As a film actor he starred in Yves Robert's War of the Buttons (La Guerre des boutons) in 1962.

Partial filmography

 Un cheval pour deux (1962) - L'agent de police Léon
 War of the Buttons (1962) - A countryman
 Les copains (1965) - Minor rôle (uncredited)
 Les malabars sont au parfum (1966) - M. Pincard - le ministre de l'Intérieur
 Le caïd de Champignol (1966) - Le brigadier
 Kiss Me General (1966) - L'aubergiste
 Le dimanche de la vie (1967)
 Asterix the Gaul (1967) - Petit rôle (voice, uncredited)
 Asterix and Cleopatra (1968) - Panoramix, le druide (voice)
 Une baleine qui avait mal aux dents (1974) - Henri
 The Twelve Tasks of Asterix (1976) - Le réceptionniste (voice)
 The Smurfs and the Magic Flute (1976) - Le pêcheur (voice)
 L'amour en herbe (1977) - Le proviseur
 La Ballade des Dalton (1978) - L'imprimeur (voice)
 The Dogs (1979) - Montagnac, le pharmacien
 The Twin (1984) - Le maire
 Asterix Versus Caesar (1985) - Panoramix, le druide (voice)
 Asterix in Britain (1986) - Panoramix, le druide (voice)
 Babar: The Movie (1989) - Old Tusk (French version, voice)
 Asterix and the Big Fight (1989) - Panoramix, le druide (voice)
 Asterix Conquers America (1994) - Panoramix, le druide (voice)
 Le dernier des pélicans (1996)

References

External links
 

1919 births
2008 deaths
French male stage actors
French male film actors
French comedians
Burials at Père Lachaise Cemetery
20th-century French comedians